Dulaj Ranatunga (born 29 March 1999) is a Sri Lankan cricketer. He made his Twenty20 debut for Kurunegala Youth Cricket Club in the 2018–19 SLC Twenty20 Tournament on 16 February 2019. He made his List A debut for Kurunegala Youth Cricket Club in the 2018–19 Premier Limited Overs Tournament on 10 March 2019.

References

External links
 

1999 births
Living people
Sri Lankan cricketers
Kurunegala Youth Cricket Club cricketers
Place of birth missing (living people)